Ansar Al Mawadda Sporting Club is a football club based in Tabbaneh, a district in Tripoli, Lebanon, that competes in the .

Established in 1968 as Racing Hazmieh, the club's licence was bought by Al Shabab Al Arabi Club Beirut in 2005, before changing their name to Ansar Al Mawadda in 2019. Their first and only participation in the Lebanese Premier League was in the 2017–18 season, having won the 2016–17 Lebanese Second Division.

History
Founded in 1968 as Racing Hazmieh, in 2005 Al Shabab Al Arabi Club Beirut bought the licence of the former club. In 2010 they won the Lebanese Fourth Division title, moving to the Third Division. In 2016 they moved to the Second Division and the following year they promoted to the Lebanese Premier League for the first time in their history. Their stay didn't last long, as in 2018 they were relegated back to the Second Division, before being relegated the following year to the Third Division.

In 2019, the club was purchased by Al Ansar FC president Nabil Badr, who transferred the team from Beirut to Tripoli and renamed it Ansar Al Mawadda Sporting Club.

Honours 
 Lebanese Second Division
 Winners (1): 2016–17

See also 
 List of football clubs in Lebanon
 List of association football clubs with multiple consecutive promotions or relegations

References

Ansar Al Mawadda SC
Football clubs in Lebanon
Association football clubs established in 1968